Joey Adams (born Joseph Abramowitz; January 6, 1911 – December 2, 1999) was an American comedian, vaudevillian, radio host, nightclub performer and author, who was inducted into the New York Friars' Club in 1977 and wrote the book Borscht Belt in 1973.

Early life
Adams grew up in Brownsville, Brooklyn, "a predominantly Jewish section of the borough at the time of his birth." After graduating from the local public school, junior high school, and high school, Adams continued to City College, but left before graduating. His siblings included a sister and three brothers.

His father Nathan Abramowitz was a tailor who later moved to the Bronx. His mother was Ida Chonin.

Career and married life
He changed his name to Joey Adams in 1930, and married his second wife, Cindy Adams, in 1952. For many years Joey (whose "first wife was the sister of Walter Winchell’s wife") wrote the Strictly for Laughs column in the New York Post, the same paper where 1930-born Cindy established her reputation as a society/gossip columnist.

Adams' career spanned more than 70 years and included appearances in nightclubs and vaudeville shows. He also hosted for a while his own radio show and wrote 23 books, including From Gags to Riches, Joey Adams Joke Book, Laugh Your Calories Away, On the Road with Uncle Sam and Encyclopedia of Humor. The Yale Book of Quotations cites him as being the first to say, "With friends like that, who needs enemies?". He also hosted an unsold game show pilot called Rate Your Mate based on a 1950s radio show of the same name (also hosted by Adams) in 1951.
 

On September 7, 1952, The Joey Adams Show debuted on WAAM-TV in Baltimore. The comedy-variety program was broadcast on Sunday nights from 10 to 10:30 p.m. Eastern Time "with a large weekly talent budget". He made numerous other TV appearances over the years, including on The Ed Sullivan Show, Howard Stern's 1990s TV shows, and What's My Line?, and was in the films Singing in the Dark (1956, of which he was also executive producer), Don't Worry, We'll Think of a Title (1966), and Silent Prey (1997). For many years, he hosted a radio talk show on WEVD in New York. In addition, Adams also hosted the short-lived 1953 game show Back That Fact on ABC.

Honors
In 1963 Adams, then serving as AGVA president, helped to finance and organize an August 5 variety show in Birmingham, Alabama, to raise funds for the August 28 March on Washington for Jobs and Freedom. Adams shared the stage with numerous speakers and performers, including Martin Luther King Jr., Ray Charles, Dick Gregory, Nina Simone, Joe Louis, Johnny Mathis, James Baldwin and The Shirelles.

For his civic work, Adams was honored by presidents and statesmen, and he held honorary doctorates in comedy from his alma mater City College, and from Columbia University, Long Island University, and New York University.

He was active in the New York Friars Club and was president of the American Guild of Variety Artists AGVA. He was appointed as Commissioner of Youth for the City of New York by Mayor Robert F. Wagner, Jr. emulating Fiorello LaGuardia's civic-mindness in recognition for his efforts in battling juvenile delinquency on behalf of the AGVA Youth Fund. Governor Nelson Rockefeller also encouraged him to spread his program throughout the entire state, and eventually it moved westward to California.

Death
Adams died December 2, 1999, at St. Vincent's Hospital in Manhattan, aged 88, from heart failure. Eulogies were delivered by Adams' widow and Mayor Rudy Giuliani. Services were held at Riverside Memorial Chapel. His widow had his remains cremated.

References

Further reading

External links
 
 

1911 births
1999 deaths
20th-century American comedians
20th-century American non-fiction writers
American columnists
American game show hosts
Jewish American writers
Jewish American male comedians
Writers from Brooklyn
20th-century American Jews